Gaiety Theatre, Boston may refer to:

 Gaiety Theatre, Boston (1878), Boston, Massachusetts,
 Gaiety Theatre, Boston (1908), Boston, Massachusetts